The 2004–05 Powergen Cup was the 34th annual rugby union cup competition in England. Leeds Tykes won the competition for the first time in their history. The event was sponsored by Powergen and the final was held at Twickenham Stadium.

This was the last season in which the competition was confined to English teams only; from the 2005-06 season, the Welsh regional teams joined to form the Anglo-Welsh Cup.  This season also marked the last time that teams outside of the English Premiership were permitted to enter.

Earlier Rounds
Earlier rounds of the competition were run on a seeded system.  Earlier rounds included Clubs which were lower in the RFU league structure, clubs higher in the leagues joined at later rounds.

The Qualifier Round consisted of 64 Clubs nominated by the Constituent Bodies (CB).  Each CB nominated 2 Clubs, or 3 for the larger CBs such as Middlesex and Lancashire.  These teams were usually selected through the previous season's County Cup (CB Cup) competitions.  All were Level 5 or below.  This Round produced 32 teams for the next round.

The Preliminary Round consisted of the 32 winning teams from the Qualifier Round and produced 16 teams for the 1st Round proper.

In the 1st Round, the 16 teams that won their Preliminary Round matches were joined by 14 National League 3 North and 14 National League 3 South clubs.  National 3 was Level 4 of the RFU league structure; these leagues have since been renamed as National League 2 North and South.  A total of 44 teams meant that this round consisted of 22 matches.

For the 2nd Round, the 22 teams that won their 1st Round matches were joined by 14 National League 2 clubs.  National 2 was Level 3 of the RFU league structure; this league have since been renamed as National League 1.  A total of 36 teams meant that this round consisted of 18 matches.

In the 3rd Round, the 18 teams that won their 2nd Round matches were joined by 14 National League 1 clubs.  National 1 was Level 2 of the RFU league structure; this league have since been renamed as the RFU Championship.  A total of 32 teams meant that this round consisted of 16 matches.

The 4th and 5th Rounds reduced the 16 teams that won their 3rd Round matches to 4 teams to advance to the 6th Round.

The 6th Round consisted of the 4 teams that won their 5th Round matches, joined by 12 Premiership clubs.  The Premiership is, and remains, Level 1 of the RFU league structure, the highest level.  A total of 16 teams meant that this round consisted of 8 matches.

Subsequent rounds were a standard knockout format of Quarter-finals, Semi-finals and a Final to produce an outright Cup winner.

Tablular form

First round

Second round

Third round

Fourth round

Fifth round

Later Rounds
The 12 Premiership teams joined the 4 qualifiers from Round 5 to make up the draw for Round 6.

1 London Wasps disqualified for fielding an ineligible player

Final

See also
 2004–05 English Premiership (rugby union)

References

2004–05 rugby union tournaments for clubs
2004–05 in English rugby union
2004-05